Chahar Gush (also Romanized as Chahār Gūsh; also known as Charāh Gūsh) is a village in Shurab Rural District, Veysian District, Dowreh County, Lorestan Province, Iran. At the 2006 census, its population was 146, in 34 families.

References 

Towns and villages in Dowreh County